The Kulobi people, also spelt Kulyabi or Kulabi, are the Tajik inhabitants of the southwest area of Tajikistan.

History
The term Kulobi comes from the Kulob Oblast that existed during the Soviet period and was merged with Qurghonteppa Oblast in 1992 to create Khatlon Province. The Kulobis are ethnic Tajiks and speak Tajik. During the Civil War in Tajikistan the Kulyabis fought on the side of the government against Gharmis and Pamiris. Emomalii Rahmon, from Dangara in Kulob oblast, became president of Tajikistan in November 1992 when Kulobi militiamen took control of the capital Dushanbe from opposition forces. The current government in Tajikistan is perceived to be dominated by Kulobis.

References

Ethnic groups in Tajikistan